The cycling competitions at the 1992 Olympic Games in Barcelona consisted of two different categories: road cycling and track cycling, with ten events being contested. The road team time trial event took place at the Circuit de Catalunya and the A-17 highway, the individual road races were held in Sant Sadurní d'Anoia, and track cycling took place at the Velòdrom d'Horta.

Road cycling

Men's

Women's

Track cycling

Men's

Women's

Medal table

Participating nations
451 cyclists from 76 nations competed.

Broken records

OR = Olympic record, WR = World record

Sources

References

External links
Official Olympic Report

 
1992 Summer Olympics events
1992
Olympics